December 27 - Eastern Orthodox liturgical calendar - December 29

All fixed commemorations below are observed on January 10 by Orthodox Churches on Old Calendar.

For December 28th, Orthodox Churches on the Old Calendar commemorate the Saints listed on December 15.

Feasts
 Afterfeast of the Nativity of Christ.

Saints
 Apostle Nicanor the Deacon, one of the Seven Deacons, and one of the Seventy (34)
 Martyr Secundus, an Enlightener of Spain, sent by the Apostles to Spain to preach the Gospel of Jesus Christ (1st century)
 The 20,000 Martyrs of Nicomedia (302), including: 
 Hieromartyr Glycerius, priest;
 Deacons Theophilus and Migdonius;
 Martyrs Zeno, Dorotheus, Mardonius, Indes, Gorgonius, Peter, and Euthymius; 
 Virgin-martyrs Agape, Domna (the former pagan priestess), Theophila, and others.
 Martyr Ploutodoros.
 Venerable Babylas of Tarsus in Cilicia.
 Venerable Stephen the Wonderworker.

Pre-Schism Western saints
 Martyrs Castor, Victor and Rogatian, in North Africa.
 Saint Domnio (Domnion), a righteous priest in Rome.
 Saint Romulus and Conindrus, two of the first people to preach Orthodoxy on the Isle of Man, they were contemporaries of St Patrick (c. 450)
 Saint Maughold (Maccaldus), a former brigand in Ireland, was converted by St Patrick and sent to the Isle of Man, where his episcopate was very fruitful (c. 488)
 Saint Antony of Lérins (Anthony the Hermit), renowned for miracles (c. 520)

Post-Schism Orthodox saints
 Saint Simon the Myrrh-gusher, founder of Simonopetra, Mt. Athos (1287)
 Saint Ignatius, Monk, of Loma (Vologda) (Ignatii of Lomsk and Yaroslavsk) (1591)
 Saint Cornelius, monk of Krypetsk Monastery (Pskov) (1903)

New martyrs and confessors
 New Hieromartyr Nikodim (Kononov), Bishop of Belgorod, at Solovki (1918)
 New Hieromartyr Arcadius Reshetnikov, Deacon (1918)
 New Hieromartyr Alexander, Priest (1920)
 New Hieromartyrs Theoctistus, Leonid, and Nicholas, Priests (1937)
 New Hieromartyrs Arethus, and Alexander, Priests (1938)

Other commemorations
 Repose of Joseph the Hesychast (Romania) (1828)

Icon gallery

Notes

References

Sources
 December 28/January 10. Orthodox Calendar (PRAVOSLAVIE.RU).
 January 10 / December 28. HOLY TRINITY RUSSIAN ORTHODOX CHURCH (A parish of the Patriarchate of Moscow).
 December 28. OCA - The Lives of the Saints.
 The Autonomous Orthodox Metropolia of Western Europe and the Americas (ROCOR). St. Hilarion Calendar of Saints for the year of our Lord 2004. St. Hilarion Press (Austin, TX). p. 3.
 December 28. Latin Saints of the Orthodox Patriarchate of Rome.
 The Roman Martyrology. Transl. by the Archbishop of Baltimore. Last Edition, According to the Copy Printed at Rome in 1914. Revised Edition, with the Imprimatur of His Eminence Cardinal Gibbons. Baltimore: John Murphy Company, 1916. pp. 399–400.
Greek Sources
 Great Synaxaristes:  28 ΔΕΚΕΜΒΡΙΟΥ. ΜΕΓΑΣ ΣΥΝΑΞΑΡΙΣΤΗΣ.
  Συναξαριστής. 28 Δεκεμβρίου. ECCLESIA.GR. (H ΕΚΚΛΗΣΙΑ ΤΗΣ ΕΛΛΑΔΟΣ). 
Russian Sources
  10 января (28 декабря). Православная Энциклопедия под редакцией Патриарха Московского и всея Руси Кирилла (электронная версия). (Orthodox Encyclopedia - Pravenc.ru).
  28 декабря (ст.ст.) 10 января 2013 (нов. ст.). Русская Православная Церковь Отдел внешних церковных связей. (DECR).

December in the Eastern Orthodox calendar